From 1930–1962, Fort Wayne, Indiana, was home to the tallest building in Indiana—the Lincoln Bank Tower. Today, the tallest building in the city is the 27-story Indiana Michigan Power Center, which rises  and was completed in 1982. This building stands as the fourth-tallest in Indiana and the tallest outside Indianapolis. It is also the tallest reinforced concrete building in Indiana. The city's second-tallest building is the PNC Center, which rises . Of the 40 tallest buildings in Indiana, three are located in Fort Wayne. As of May 2015, there are two completed skyscrapers and ten completed high-rises in the city, with one under construction.

Tallest buildings
This includes spires and architectural details but does not include antenna masts. An equal sign (=) following a rank indicates the same height between two or more buildings. The "Year" column indicates the year in which a building was completed.

Tallest under construction, approved and proposed
This lists high-rises that are under construction, approved or proposed in Fort Wayne and planned to rise at least  in height, but are not yet completed.

Currently, there are no high-rises over 150 feet planned in Fort Wayne.

Timeline of tallest buildings
This lists buildings that once held the title of tallest building in Fort Wayne.

Notes
A. This building was destroyed in 1993 by fire ignited from a lightning strike.
B. This building was constructed as the Fort Wayne National Bank Building, but has since been renamed PNC Center.
C. This building was constructed as One Summit Square, but has since been renamed Indiana Michigan Power Center.

References
General
Emporis.com – Fort Wayne
Specific

External links
Fort Wayne Skyscraper Diagram on SkyscraperPage.com

Fort Wayne
 List
Tallest in Fort Wayne